Pradipta Pramanik (born 8 October 1998) is an Indian cricketer who plays for Bengal. He made his List A debut on 18 December 2015 in the 2015–16 Vijay Hazare Trophy. He made his first-class debut for Bengal in the 2017–18 Ranji Trophy on 17 November 2017.

See also
 List of Bengal cricketers

References

External links
 

1998 births
Living people
Indian cricketers
Bengal cricketers
Cricketers from Kolkata